Steinar Pedersen (born 6 June 1975) is a former Norwegian football defender. He is the son of Erik Ruthford Pedersen and brother of Kjetil Ruthford Pedersen. Pedersen is the first Norwegian to win the UEFA Champions League.

His career began with Start. After their relegation in 1996, he played for Borussia Dortmund, IFK Göteborg and Lillestrøm before returning to Start in 2002. With Borussia Dortmund he won the 1997 Champions League, although he did not play in the final. He did however make two appearances en route to the final. He was capped once for the Norway national team, in a 5–0 friendly loss to the USA.

References

1975 births
Living people
Sportspeople from Kristiansand
Norwegian footballers
Association football defenders
Norway international footballers
Norway youth international footballers
Norway under-21 international footballers
UEFA Champions League winning players
Eliteserien players
Norwegian First Division players
Bundesliga players
Allsvenskan players
IK Start players
Lillestrøm SK players
Borussia Dortmund players
IFK Göteborg players
Norwegian football managers
Eliteserien managers
FK Jerv managers
IK Start managers
Arendal Fotball managers
Norwegian expatriate footballers
Expatriate footballers in Germany
Norwegian expatriate sportspeople in Germany
Expatriate footballers in Sweden
Norwegian expatriate sportspeople in Sweden